Mücahit Albayrak (born 30 July 1991) is a Turkish professional footballer who plays as a leftback for Samsunspor.

Professional career
Albayrak spent most of his early career with Ümraniyespor in the amateur divisions of Turkish football. He then joined Gaziantep in 2018, and followed that with successive loans with BB Erzurumspor. Albayrak made his professional debut with BB Erzurumspor on a 2-1 Süper Lig loss to Sivasspor on 20 September 2020.

References

External links
 
 

1991 births
Sportspeople from Rize
Living people
Turkish footballers
Association football fullbacks
Ümraniyespor footballers
Gaziantep F.K. footballers
Büyükşehir Belediye Erzurumspor footballers
Samsunspor footballers
Süper Lig players
TFF First League players
TFF Second League players
TFF Third League players